Charfeddine Belhaj (born 7 July 1985) is a Tunisian football defender.

References

1985 births
Living people
Tunisian footballers
EGS Gafsa players
ES Zarzis players
Stade Gabèsien players
US Ben Guerdane players
ES Métlaoui players
Association football defenders
Tunisian Ligue Professionnelle 1 players